David Robert Walsh (born 17 December 1946, Bombay, Maharashtra, India) is a former English first-class cricketer and current cricket administrator. He is also a historian.

Education
Walsh was educated at Marlborough College, where he captained the First XI in 1965 and played in the annual match for the Marylebone Cricket Club (MCC) Schools XI against Combined Services at Lord's. He went up to Brasenose College, Oxford University.

Cricket career
A middle-order batsman, Walsh made his first-class debut for Oxford University in 1966, scoring 56 against Hampshire in his second match, but was unable to maintain his form and lost his place in the side. He struggled again in 1967, but kept his place in a weak side, and "fought his way doggedly out of his past to achieve reliability". He played all 15 of Oxford's matches, scoring 325 runs at an average of 16.25 with a top score of 46.

In the six matches he played in 1968 he was more successful, and he finished with 300 runs at 33.33. He hit 76 not out in the second innings against Glamorgan ("a splendid defensive innings") and 65 and 28 against Cambridge University at Lord's, adding 131 for the second wicket with the captain, Fred Goldstein. In the third match in 1969 he "produced a variety of strokes hitherto unseen from him" when he scored 207 against Warwickshire, with 32 fours and two sixes, adding 270 for the sixth wicket with Stuart Westley. He also scored 138 and 41 against D.H. Robins' XI. He finished the season with 748 runs at 37.40, and played in his third University match.

He played seven matches between 1966 and 1972 for Sussex Second XI, but all his first-class cricket was for Oxford University.

Later career
After two years teaching at Melbourne Grammar School, Walsh was appointed to Tonbridge School in 1972 and spent the rest of his career there, retiring in 2009 as Second Master. He was Chairman of Headmasters' Conference Schools cricket for twenty years. He has held various administrative positions with the Marylebone Cricket Club (MCC), and is a trustee of the MCC Foundation.

Walsh is the author of three books. A Duty to Serve: Tonbridge School and the 1939-45 War was published by Third Millennium in 2011; Public Schools and the Great War: The Generation Lost, co-written with Sir Anthony Seldon, was published in 2013 by Pen & Sword; Public Schools and the Second World War, again co-authored with Sir Anthony Seldon, was published by Pen & Sword in August 2020.

References

External links
 David Walsh at CricketArchive

1946 births
Living people
Cricketers from Mumbai
People educated at Marlborough College
Alumni of Brasenose College, Oxford
English cricketers
Oxford University cricketers
British schoolteachers
Oxford and Cambridge Universities cricketers
English cricket administrators
21st-century English historians